Clive Grunshaw (born October 1961) is a Labour Party politician who served as Lancashire Police and Crime Commissioner covering the police force area of Lancashire Constabulary from 2012 to 2021. He is the first person to hold the post and was elected on 15 November 2012 and re-elected in 2016.

Grunshaw, a former milkman, said it was a "new era for policing"; however, he admitted turnout was "disappointing". He was formerly Lancashire County Council member for Fleetwood East and Pharos Ward Councillor for Wyre Council, where he was Leader of a minority Labour Group from May 2007 until resigning from that position on 20 November 2012 on assuming the post of Police and Crime Commissioner. Grunshaw also stood unsuccessfully as the Labour Party candidate for Lancaster and Fleetwood constituency at the 2010 general election.

November 2015 marked three years since the first Police and Crime Commissioner elections. During the year Grunshaw was a prominent campaigner in opposing proposed changes to the way police forces are funded which would have seen Lancashire Constabulary lose £24.5 million. Minister of State for Policing Mike Penning MP was forced to admit to MPs that "a statistical error was made in the data used" and paused the process pending a further review.

Expenses controversy

In December 2012 a Freedom of Information request uncovered information relating to expenses claimed by Clive Grunshaw which has caused some political opponents to demand his resignation. It was alleged that he claimed mileage twice for meetings which took place at the same time, suggesting in one example that he had driven from his Fleetwood home for Preston an hour apart for two separate meetings. In response, Grunshaw said, "At no point have I wilfully submitted claims which I know to be untrue. Clearly there are overlaps in times on some of the claims and this is what is so disappointing. The claims are genuinely intentioned but my process appears to have been flawed."

Following an investigation by the Independent Police Complaints Commission (IPCC) which found that "while errors had been made in expense claims these were due to carelessness rather than any dishonest intent on the part of Mr Grunshaw"  the Commissioner criticised the length of time the review took. Mr Grunshaw said "It has taken too long to investigate and the IPCC has taken way too long to publish the report."

Election results

References

Police and crime commissioners in England
Living people
1961 births
Members of Lancashire County Council
Labour Party (UK) councillors
Labour Party police and crime commissioners
Labour Party (UK) parliamentary candidates